Benzenedicarboxylic acid is a group of chemical compounds which are dicarboxylic derivatives of benzene. Benzenedicarboxylic acid comes in three isomers:

Phthalic acid (1,2-benzenedicarboxylic acid)
Isophthalic acid (1,3-benzenedicarboxylic acid)
Terephthalic acid (1,4-benzenedicarboxylic acid)

All isomers share the molecular weight 166.13 g/mol and the chemical formula C8H6O4.

Benzoic acids
Dicarboxylic acids